Maksim Konomi (born August 13, 1946 in Tirana) was the chairman of the Committee for Science and Technology for Albania in the 1992 government of Sali Berisha. He is a member of the Democratic Party.

References

Living people
1946 births
Democratic Party of Albania politicians
Politicians from Tirana
20th-century Albanian politicians